Cocked Hat Island, located off the eastern coast of Ellesmere Island, is a part of the Qikiqtaaluk Region of the Canadian territory of Nunavut. The island is located within the Arctic Archipelago, and is a part of the Queen Elizabeth Islands.

History 
Adolphus Greely's Lady Franklin Bay Expedition tried to land on Cocked Hat Island in 1883 after spending two months moving southward from their Fort Conger site. Because of ice and wind, they were pushed to Cape Sabine  further south on nearby Pim Island.

References

External links 
 Painting, 1930, by the late Dr. Naomi Jackson Groves
 Cocked Hat Island in the Atlas of Canada - Toporama; Natural Resources Canada

Islands of the Queen Elizabeth Islands
Islands of Baffin Bay
Uninhabited islands of Qikiqtaaluk Region